The 1972–73 Midland Football League season was the 73rd in the history of the Midland Football League, a football competition in England.

Clubs
The league featured 15 clubs which competed in the previous season, along with three new clubs:
Bridlington Trinity, transferred from the Yorkshire League
Hednesford, transferred from the West Midlands (Regional) League
Stockton

League table

References

External links

Midland Football League (1889)
M